Over the Overlords is the sixth studio album by Chicago punk band Naked Raygun. It was released on August 2, 2021, on Wax Trax! Records. It is their first album in 31 years. 

The album features an instrumental that appears in the first and last tracks, and occasionally as interludes throughout the album, mostly with a repeating drum line.

Background 
The album is notable for being the last release to feature bassist Pierre Kezdy, due to his death in October 2020. Although the album was released after Pierre's death, and also featured bassist Fritz Doreza, Pierre had recorded for the album prior to his death.

The album is also notable for being the first Naked Raygun album since 1990's Raygun...Naked Raygun, and the first release of new material since the series of singles the band released in 2009, 2010, and 2011.

In 2020, ProRawk Records released a compilation album titled ...On the Rawks, which featured the song "Broken Things". This would be the first release of a song from the album, although "Broken Things" would not be released as a single until November 19, 2021, along with a lyric video. 

The album's first official single was "Living in the Good Times", which premiered as a music video on April 9, 2021. The music video features many fan-submitted clips of people singing the song in their homes, and contains a guest appearance from Daryl Wilson of The Bollweevils. It was filmed in and on the roof of Cobra Lounge in Chicago. 

The song "Ode to Sean McKeough" is a tribute to former Cobra Lounge/All Rise Brewing owner and Riot Fest co-founder Sean McKeough, who passed away from a stroke in 2016.

Track listing 

Note: The CD and vinyl releases do not feature "Intro", "Vijay's Big Organ", "Eric's Across the Street", or "Outro Outre" on the printed track listing. 

Note: The live version of "Knock Me Down" is specified as "live in Chicago 2015" on physical releases.

Personnel 
Naked Raygun
 Jeff Pezzati – vocals
 Eric Spicer – drums
 Pierre Kezdy – bass
 Bill Stephens – guitar
 Fritz Doreza – bass

Additional musicians and production
 Steven Gills – recording, engineering, mixing, production, additional keys
 Naked Raygun – production
 Mike Chicowicz – trumpet
 Henry Salgado – trombone
 Paul Mertens – tenor saxophone
 Vijay Tellis-Nayak – additional keys
 Morgan Spencer – backing vocals on "Suicide Bomb"
 Ted Jenson – mastering

Album art and design
 Mark Skillicorn – design
 Brian Trost – design
 Miguel Echemendia – cover illustration

References 

2021 albums
Naked Raygun albums
Wax Trax! Records albums